(lit. "southward advance" or "march to the south") is a historiographical concept that describes the historic southward expansion of the territory of Vietnamese dynasties' dominions of Đại Việt from the 11th to the 19th centuries. The concept of  has differing interpretations, with some equating it to Viet colonialism of the south and to a series of wars and conflicts between several Vietnamese kingdoms and Champa Kingdoms, which resulted in the annexation and Vietnamization of the former Cham states as well as indigenous territories.

The Viet domain was gradually expanded from its original heartland in the Red River Delta into southern territories, which were controlled by the Champa kingdoms. In a span of some 700 years, the Viet domain tripled the area of its territory and more or less acquired the elongated shape of modern-day Vietnam. Beginning in the 20th century, modern Vietnamese historiography, under the auspices of nationalism and racialism, coined the term  for what they believed to be a gradual, inevitable southern expansion of Vietnamese domains. In the 15th, 16th and 17th centuries, following the Fourth Chinese domination of Vietnam (1407–1427), the Vietnamese defeated the less centralized state of Champa and seized its capital in the 1471 Cham–Vietnamese War. From the 17th to the 19th centuries, Vietnamese settlers penetrated the Mekong Delta. The Nguyễn lords of Huế wrested the southernmost territory from Cambodia by diplomacy and by force, which completed the "March to the South". Nam tiến was an influential idea among Vietnamese nationalism in the 20th century, serving as an romanticized conceptualization of the Vietnamese identity, especially in South Vietnam and modern Vietnam.

History

11th to 14th centuries (Lý and Trần dynasties) 
Records suggest that there was an attack on the Champa kingdom and its capital, Vijaya, from Vietnam in 1069 (under the reign of Lý Nhân Tông) to punish Champa for armed raids in Vietnam. Cham King Rudravarman III was defeated and captured. He offered Champa's three northern provinces to Vietnam (now Quảng Bình and Quảng Trị Provinces).

In 1377, the Cham capital was unsuccessfully besieged by a Vietnamese army during the Battle of Vijaya.

15th to 19th centuries (Later Lê dynasty to the Nguyễn lords) 

The native inhabitants of the Central Highlands are the Degar (Montagnard) people but otherwise are mostly Katuic, Bahnaric, and Chamic-speaking peoples. The Vietnamese from the Dai Viet conquered and annexed the area during their southward expansion.

Major Champa–Vietnam Wars were fought again in the 15th century during the Lê dynasty, which eventually led to the defeat of Vijaya and to the demise of Champa in 1471. The citadel of Vijaya was besieged for one month in 1403 until the Vietnamese troops had to withdraw because of a shortage of food. The final attack came in early 1471, after almost 70 years without a major military confrontation between Champa and Vietnam. It is interpreted to have been a reaction to Champa asking China for reinforcements to attack Vietnam.

Cham provinces were seized by the Vietnamese Nguyễn lords. Provinces and districts that had been originally controlled by Cambodia were taken by Vo Vuong.

Cambodia was constantly invaded by the Nguyễn lords. Around a thousand Vietnamese settlers were slaughtered in 1667 in Cambodia by a combined Chinese-Cambodian force. Vietnamese settlers started to inhabit the Mekong Delta, which was previously inhabited by the Khmer. That caused the Vietnamese to be subjected to Cambodian retaliation. The Cambodians told Catholic European envoys that the Vietnamese persecution of Catholics justified retaliatory attacks to be launched against the Vietnamese colonists.

19th century (Nguyễn dynasty) 

Vietnamese Emperor Minh Mang enacted the final conquest of the Champa Kingdom by a series of Cham–Vietnamese Wars. In 1832, the Emperor annexed Champa while the Vietnamese coercively fed lizard and pig meat to Cham Muslims and cow meat to Cham Hindus, against their will, to punish them and to assimilate them to Vietnamese culture. The Cham Muslim leader Katip Suma, who was educated in Kelantan, came back to Champa and led the dissatisfied Champa Muslims to declare a jihad revolt against Vietnamese rulers, but he was promptly defeated.

Minh Mang sinicized ethnic minorities such as Cambodians, claimed the legacy of Confucianism and China's Han dynasty for Vietnam, and used the term Han people 漢人 (Hán nhân) to refer to the Vietnamese. Minh Mang declared, "We must hope that their barbarian habits will be subconsciously dissipated, and that they will daily become more infected by Han [Sino-Vietnamese] customs." The policies were directed at the Khmer and the hill tribes. The Nguyen lord Nguyen Phuc Chu had referred to Vietnamese as "Han people" in 1712 to differentiate them from Chams. The Nguyễn lords established đồn điền, state-owned agribusiness, after 1790. Emperor Gia Long (Nguyễn Phúc Ánh), in differentiating between Khmer and Vietnamese, said, " [ 漢|夷|有限 ]" meaning "the Vietnamese and the barbarians must have clear borders." His successor, Minh Mang, implemented an acculturation integration policy directed at minority non-Vietnamese peoples. Phrases like Thanh nhân (清人, Qing people) or Đường nhân (唐人, Tang people) were used to refer to ethnic Chinese by the Vietnamese, who called themselves as Hán dân (漢民) and Hán nhân (漢人) in Vietnam in the 1800s, under the Nguyễn dynasty.

Historicity

Analysis and periodization
Casual readers would commonly glimpse the Nam Tien as an all-important series of historical events in territorial evolution that made up modern Vietnam and Indochina. Indeed, modern scholars have tried to deconstruct the Nam Tien by scrutinizing and questioning whether the it even took place. Tracing back to all precolonial Vietnamese veritable records, chronicles, texts, and inscriptions, there is no single reference to a policy or a hint calling any dedicated movement that would today be described as Nam Tien. To understand Nam Tien thus requires critical rethinking. Michael Vickery articulates that it was not steady, and its stages show that there was no continuing policy of southward expansion. Each territorial push was a move or reaction against a particular unbonded event. A famous historian of pre-colonial Vietnam, Keith W. Taylor, totally opposes and rejects the idea of Nam tiến, as he provides alternate explanations. Momorki Shirō, a renowned historian from Osaka University, scolds the Nam Tien "Kinh-centric historical view." Rather than an authentic continuous historical phenomenon in popular perceptions, it is a colonial and postcolonial nationalist historiographic construction.

Scholarly consensus does agree that Vietnamese southward expansions that have been conceptualized into the modern-day Nam Tien did not start until at least the early 15th century AD. Numerous wars were fought between Champa and Dai Viet before the 1400s, but they happened indecisively, and there were territorial exchanges for both sides. Some scholars put the starting date of Nam Tien to 1471 precisely when the word Nam tien itself did make sense. Therefore, the starting date of the 11th century should be rejected.

Nam Tien in South Vietnam/Republic of Vietnam (RVN) 
At the onset of the 20th century, nationalism swept across the globe. In Asia, nationalists and advocates of the nation-state must have been joyful in crafting homogenous nationalities like "Chinese," "Cambodian," "Vietnamese," etc., which in common assumptions are as almost synonymous with the predominant ethnic group. The Nam tiến emerged at that time. In the postcolonial Republic of Vietnam, Vietnamese (Kinh) intellectuals began the selective remembering of history to construct sources of national pride for the newly formed Vietnamese nation. They probably found or inherited the idea from Hung Giang's article La Formation du pays d’Annam, published in July 1928. In that first nationalist narrative praising the Nam tiến, Lord Nguyễn Hoàng allegedly "urged his people to keep moving southward," coined as Nam tiến.

Early French scholarships in the late 19th century shaped Indianized kingdoms like Angkor and Champa, which had been declined mainly from Vietnamese expansionism, and mimicked them as the main villains who emerged at the end of the tale. Thereby, the French hypedly acted as "rescuers" of "lost civilizations" and prevent their heritage from being completely "swallowed up" by the Vietnamese by colonization and assimilation. After 1954, scholars in North and South Vietnam held varying reactions to French Cham studies. One side from Hanoi promoted the "multi-ethnic history" and "solidarity between peoples against invaders and feudal rulers" to fit its Marxist historiography and so little attention was paid to Champa itself. The other side celebrated the ethnohistory, virtually at odds with the Hanoi historiography. Frankly, Vietnamese nationalist writers in post-colonial Vietnam who were mesmerized by the French hyped interpretation of the Vietnamese conquest of Champa, began using it as evidence for "ancient Vietnamese greatness."

The most famous apostle of the Nam tiến in RVN in Saigon, Việt sử: Xứ Đàng Trong 1558–1777: Cuộc Nam tiến của dân tộc Việt Nam, an essay of Vietnamese Nam Tien ‘Southward March’, by the historian Phan Khoang (1906–1971), synthesizing a 'very real' concept of Nam tiến at its title, also the most detailed book about the Nam Tien. In the book, the author offers a quite strong Vietnamese-centric biased view and stereotyping negative sentiments toward the "conquered people." The book's main discourse is about the presumed "march" (piecing unrelated and distant events together) of the Vietnamese along the coast from the Red River Delta, traditionally said to be begun in the 11th century, until they reached the end tail of the Mekong Delta in 18th century. The essay concerning Champa begins by treating it as a single unified kingdom, like framework of early French scholars, and tracing the kingdom's genesis to the Indianized Linyi (Lam Ap). Little attention was paid to the civilizational aspects of the Cham, Khmer, and indigenous groups. They were considered by earlier colonial-era works indiscriminately as the same "Indianized origins." Those colonial scholars had introduced blatant Eurocentric-framed concepts like 'Sinic or Indic civilization spheres,' denying and downplaying the achievements of indigenous non-nation peoples of Southeast Asia. Ironically, they are still widely in practice today.

During early colonial Indochina, French ethnographers used the Vietnamese collective pejorative for indigenous peoples of the Central Highlands, Mois, a word carrying extremely negative connotations, imposed it on the peoples, and embraced both European and Viet colonialism in the Highlands.

Phan Khoang discusses in his essay wars between Champa and Dai Viet caused by assured "Cham aggression" by claiming that "the inferiority and aggressiveness of the Cham were the ultimate reasons leading to their fall." He convinces that the Cham were "a weaker nation" had to give ground for "the stronger nation" of the Vietnamese. Furthermore, Phan explains the demise of the final Cham kingdom in 1832 had originated from the Tay Son rebellion and shows little pity for the fate of the Cham people in the aftermath. Nevertheless, in the end, Phan Khoang highlights "the fierce and vitality of the Vietnamese nation" that wiped out Champa and gave a grateful sense of nationalistic pride. However, he notes that those events should be left open, rather than defended, defamed, or covered.

One popular author of Nam Tien exponent in the RVN was Phạm Văn Sơn (1915–1978). In the Nam tiến section of the 1959 edition of his national history Việt sử tân biên, Phạm Văn Sơn pushed triumphalist Darwinist nuances for Nam Tiến. Arguing that the Cham had mounted numerous border incursions against the "homogeneousic Vietnamese Jiaozhi and Annan" ruled by Chinese dynasties before the 10th century, he attempted to justify Vietnamese invasions of Champa in that century as retribution. As 'Vietnam' "gained independence from China," it began to move southward constantly and unstoppable because the Cham, Khmer, and indigenous peoples, according to him, were "lacking capacity and advancement to develop, and remained primitive."

Another popular book on Nam Tien in the RVN was Dohamide and Dorohime's Dân tộc Chàm lược sử (1965), the first modern history of the Cham people. The brother-historians of Cham Sunni background constructed the Nam tiến as a "process of invasion and occupation on the part of the Vietnamese." They postulated that from the 11th century onward, "Cham history was henceforth merely the retreat of 'Indian' civilization in the face of 'Chinese' civilization." They consider the conflict between Champa and Dai Viet to be due to Champa's "need to expand to the North, which was much more fertile."

The core idea of Nam tiến is the superiority of the Vietnamese (Kinh) people, culturally and racially, over the "conquered people" (Khmer, Cham, and other Austroasiatic, Austronesian, Kra-Dai, and Hmong-Mien speaking peoples). In such a popular narrative, "the fertile productive fields and wealth of the South had been brought by the civilizing force of the Viet people upon the uncivilized" is comparable with the "Vietnamese man's burdens." Non-Kinh peoples are depicted as backward and alien, as opposed to the cultured, perfect, innovative Kinh society. Thus, since non-Kinh groups have been portrayed as stagnant backward and unable to resist, and the Kinh were demonstrated as superior, the Nam Tien is thought of as a steady and irreversible "marching" process. RVN intellectuals quite publicly acknowledged the unpleasant history of the nation's past and allowed reversals to be published freely and expressed. Overall, Vietnamese victories and the conquest of the South were proudly appreciated by the RVN intellectuals.

Nam Tien in North Vietnam/Democratic Republic of Vietnam (DRV) and Post-1975 Vietnam/Socialist Republic of Vietnam (SRV)
In the Democratic Republic of Vietnam (DRV), perceptions of Nam Tien were at first unsympathetic. In the three-volume Lịch sử chế độ phong kiến Việt Nam (LSCĐPK, History of the Feudal System of Vietnam), published in 1959–1960, DRV historians likely employed Marxist and Confucian doctrines and Vietnamese subjectivism to judge past between Champa and Dai Viet. The wars of 980, the 1380s, the 1430s, and the 1440s were labeled as "self-defense" and "righteous" (chính nghĩa), and wars that brought territorial acquisitions to Dai Viet were called "aggression" (xâm lược) or "invasions" (xâm lăng), otherwise "wrongful" one (phi nghĩa). The book condemns all Vietnamese rulers after 1471. The Nam Tiến is remembered as a colonization process involving "murderous warfare and land-grabbing by the Nguyễn feudalists targeting two weakened neighbors." It paradoxically admitted that the Cham people had eventually become a part of the "Great Vietnamese nation" and that "Cham history deserves to be taught."

After the fall of Saigon, most Nam Tien writers went overseas. Within the new Socialist Republic of Vietnam (SRV), communist authors produced a revised version of history according to their views that suppresses the discourse of Nam Tien. Reasons behind the suppression of Nam Tien after 1975 were not because its racist negativism and ethnonationalism, but its contradiction of the Vietnamese Communist Party (VCP) agenda. Since the 20th century, as Vietnam was put on the thermotic ideological frontline of the Cold War between the world superpowers, Vietnamese nationalists and Marxists usually bolstered the perception about the Vietnamese as the oppressed people under the tyranny of foreign powers, "China", French colonialism and American imperialism, not the antithetical position that the Vietnamese also have been spiteful colonizers and victimizers themselves. Consequently, the history version portrays the image of an oppressed but proudly, stubborn, determined Vietnamese nation who thrashed off the yokes of foreign imperialism, has been becoming the rallying point of Vietnamese nationalism, goes completely conflicted with the inconsistent reality of Vietnamese colonialism presented in the Nam Tien.

Studying or remembering Viet colonialism and intoxicated nationalism against the margins and indigenous peoples, no matter if it is toned down, would eventually damage the Vietnamese Revolution and the party's reputations in the eyes of international leftist thinkers and the alikes. Further, it would provoke indigenous nationalism against the party and Vietnam. Building the impression of ethnic and religious harmony under socialism was also important.

The Nam tiến theory and the former South Vietnamese intellectual works were targets of Vietnamese Marxist critique and suppression for the sake of peace and the protection of good reputations. Criticism against the predominant Kinh also mitigated. Unlike the 1959 LSCĐPK, the Vietnamese and the assumed homogenous Vietnam were gradually recast and corrected as the ultimate victims, not the victimizers. Therefore, post-1960 Hanoi authors' writings saw significant shifts. Especially the 1971 DRV official history Lịch Sử Việt Nam, the Viet conquest of the South was misinterpreted into just simply groundless semi-pseudohistory 'migration of Viet people,' exclusively claimed that the migrants peacefully coexisted with the original inhabitants or settled on wildlands that had long been magically abandoned or uninhabited, without even an indistinct mention about the reality of wars and the resistance of the Cham and the indigenous peoples. Ethnic tensions between the Vietnamese with the Cham and the Khmer peoples and the suffering of conquered people become mere disputes between "feudal" rulers. For a while, it has been the mainstream thesis of Vietnam's "territorial evolution." After that 1971 publication, Champa and non-Kinh cultures were disenfranchised by being pulled out of the historiography and barely mentioned very briefly as merely insignificant outsiders.

In recent works in the context of đổi mới, SRV authors have reinserted several ideas of the Nam tiến to depict Champa, such as "aggressiveness" and "Cham provocations" while tending to portray Vietnamese southern advance as progressive. The Nguyen, the last Vietnamese dynasty, which had long been slammed by Marxist scholars, are seemingly rehabilitated in the Vietnamese historiography. The resurfacing of the Nam Tien in Vietnamese academics recently is considered highly significant. It suggests that state historians are no longer sensitively dictating RVN intellectual writings and those from international scholarship, or it may be from SRV historians' reaction to geopolitical change, particularly by growing irredentist sentiments in neighboring Cambodia.

Receptions
The effects of Vietcentric Nam tiến thinking have a great impact itself on Vietnam. Although most SRV scholars have done a great amount of research on non-Kinh cultures, they are not willing to analogize those cultures with the formation of Vietnam or to recognize today the multicultural origins of the country. One who visits national museums in Vietnam would not find out any mention of non-Kinh cultures such as Cham, Khmer, or Austronesians in the timeline on the making of Vietnam. Kinh history, supposedly began with profound Văn Lang kingdoms under the Hùng kings, which is often identified with the Dong Son culture, is exhibited and occupies almost the entire disproportionate chronology. Overall, the Kinh are indisputable protagonists in the history of (downplayed multiethnic) Vietnam. Non-Kinh "ethnic minority" artifacts are displayed as aesthetic objects in separated rooms, not about history and heritage, with little care, likely tourism magnets. They are intentionally placed in peripherical, outsider roles, not being blocky parts of the Vietnamese mainstream historiography although they made enormous contributions or direct historical impacts in Vietnam and the Southeast Asia region as a whole. Claire Sutherland, a lecturer at Northumbria University, describes the phenomenon of how Vietnamese nationalism tries to construct an illusion of Vietnam's homogeneity. She summarizes: "Official histories characterised Vietnam as a single, fixed bloc, with a common language, territory, economy and culture." Sutherland notes on the Vietnamese museums, "Non-Kinh cultures, both ancient and modern, are given a peripheral role, but are not deemed to form a part of the core, nation-building narrative. Creating an impression of Vietnam as a monolithic bloc is thus preferred to charting its gradual territorial expansion, with all the different regional histories that this would entail." Undeniably, modern Vietnamese nationalism insists on the maintenance of Vietnam's homogenous notion by inventing and persisting the "core ethnic group" hegemony in the formation of the country, and 'unhomogeneity' cultures like the Cham are marginal excluded. The "Vietnam" seen through mainstream representations is extremely generalized with broadly political buzzwords and rhetorical constructs, which lead to fallacies. It also ignores the fact that Vietnam as well as the whole of Southeast Asia are some of the most ethnolinguistic diverse places on Earth.

Historian C. Goscha denotes that the north-south Nam Tien narrative is very ethnocentric. It downplays the importance of non-Kinh peoples, who constituted the majority of Vietnam's population until the late 20th century. There were no ethnic minorities in Vietnam until rampant ethnic classification was carried out by governments in the 20th century. The indigenous peoples have been inhabiting the vast areas in Vietnam independently for thousands of years before the Vietnamese agency came up to identify them as 'ethnic minority' or tokenist Kinh as such. They have their own history and stories, interactions with the Vietnamese, and perspectives, which should not be neglected. Both contributed to each other a lot in making up Vietnam as well as part of the global culture. Indeed, "until recently there was no single S-like Vietnam running from north to south."

As Goscha reassesses, balancing between Vietnamese centrality and non-Vietnamese centrality is important, and something-centrism should be totally avoided.

Legacy

French colonial rule to late 20th century 
During the French colonial era, ethnic strife between Cambodia and Vietnam was somewhat pacified as both were parts of French Indochina. However, intergroup relations deteriorated even further, as the Cambodians viewed the Vietnamese as being a privileged group, which was allowed to migrate into Cambodia. All postcolonial Cambodian regimes, including the governments of Lon Nol and of the Khmer Rouge, relied on anti-Vietnamese rhetoric to win popular support.

In South Vietnam, intellectuals treated and consolidated the Nam tiến as an established factual history, obviously with approaches for nationalistic purposes. They saw the Nam tiến and its consequences as matters of national pride and explained a Vietnamese-dominated Vietnam with racial and cultural nationalistic viewpoints. After 1975, Hanoi scholars, on the other hand, emphasized the multiethnic solidarity and peaceful interrelating coexistence of Viet-Cham, Viet-Khmer, and non-Viet and so favored a reconstruction of a multi-ethnic history but tended to skip the discourse on Vietnamization of Champa and other indigenous peoples otherwise. They also limited the use of Nam tiến.

After 1975, some French academics sought to revive the importance of Champa itself as a historical independent polity and non-Vietnamese indigenous history that deserves to have its own rights and tractions in the history of Vietnam, rather than being scraped aside, becoming peripherical in the Vietnamese version of history, and therefore clashing with Viet-centric historiography. After the đổi mới, the narrative of Nam tiến has seen a renewal in Vietnam and has been popularised in recent years.

Today 
Whilst it is widely acknowledged that the Vietnamese were originally natives of north Vietnam and south China, who then expanded southwards, and that lands to the south are native lands of Chams and Cambodia, there have been a number of outspoken groups and individuals such as Sam Rainsy who are vehemently anti-Vietnamese in behavior and belief. Such groups and individuals believe that all ancient lands that used to belong to Cambodia should be returned. However, this would include nearly all of mainland Southeast Asia and would create competing claims with Laos and Thailand as well.

Whilst relations between Chams, Khmers and Vietnamese are cordial and respectful, with a long and complicated history with each other, relations with the government centralised in Hanoi are still sensitive.

Genetics 
Nam Tiến is considered by some as the definitive event in which Vietnam became a firmly Southeast Asian nation upon annexing territories formerly belonging to the Champa and part of Cambodia. All Vietnamese carry Southeast Asian haplotypes. The dramatic population decrease experienced by the Cham 700 years ago fits well with the southwards expansion from the Vietnamese original heartland in the Red River Delta. Autosomal SNPs consistently point to important historical gene flow within mainland Southeast Asia, and add support to a major admixture event occurring between "Chinese" and a southern Asian ancestral composite (mainly represented by the Malay). This admixture event occurred approximately 8 centuries ago, again coinciding with the Nam tiến.

See also 

History of the Cham–Vietnamese wars
Champa
Chey Chettha II
Khmer Empire
Cambodian–Vietnamese War of the 1970s and 1980s
Ostsiedlung
Reconquista, a similar concept in Spanish history
Chuang Guandong

Notes

References

Bibliography 
 
 
  
 
 
 

History of Vietnam
Vietnamese words and phrases
Territorial evolution
Historiography
Historical migrations
Cambodia–Vietnam relations
History of Champa